Tromtö House is a manor house in Blekinge, Sweden.

History
The manor is located on a small island, 5 kilometers west of Karlskrona in Ronneby Municipality. The original manor building was probably erected during the late 17th century.  The manor became part of the Realm of Sweden in 1658 after Blekinge was transferred to Swedish rule under the terms of the  Treaty of Roskilde.
From the late 17th century, it been used as a summer residence by members of the noble Wachtmeister family.
The house was given a new design in 1834, under the direction of  Countess Agathe Wrede (1799-1890), widow of  Count Hans Wachtmeister (1793-1827) 
acting governor of Blekinge county.

References

Other sources
Lönnbom Ingemar  (2015)  Blekinges byggnadsminnen: en källa till vår historia (Karlskrona: Länsstyrelsen i Blekinge län)

Buildings and structures in Blekinge County
Manor houses in Sweden